Mullum may refer to:

Mullum Malarum, Tamil film directed by J. Mahendran
Mullum Mullum Creek Linear Park, east of Melbourne, Australia in the suburbs of Doncaster East and Donvale
Mullum Mullum Creek Trail, shared use path for cyclists and pedestrians in the outer eastern suburbs in Melbourne, Victoria, Australia
Mullum-Mullum Creek, creek in the outer eastern suburbs of Melbourne, Victoria, Australia